The Avian Cheetah is a British high-wing, single-place, competition hang glider, designed by Steve Elkins and Neil Hammerton and produced by Avian Limited of Hope Valley, Derbyshire.

Design and development
The Cheetah is a development of the Avian Java and is a "topless" design without a kingpost or top wire rigging, although it retains the lower flying wires.

The current production Cheetah 150 model is made from aluminum and carbon fibre tubing, with the wing covered in Dacron sailcloth. Its  span wing has a nose angle of 130deg; and an aspect ratio of 7.5:1.

The glider can be broken down to a  package,  in length for ground transportation on a car top.

Variants
Cheetah 150
Current production version. British Hang Gliding and Paragliding Association certified.
Cheetah 160

Specifications (Cheetah 150)

References

External links
Official webpage archive on Archive.org

Hang gliders